The Cabinet Minister is an 1890 comedy play by the British writer Arthur Wing Pinero. A cabinet minister spends well beyond his means, leading to massive debts.

References

Bibliography
 Booth, Michael R. Prefaces to English nineteenth-century theatre. Oxford University Press.
 Ousby, Ian. The Cambridge guide to literature in English. Cambridge University Press, 1993.

External links

Plays by Arthur Wing Pinero
1890 plays
West End plays